Miral is a 2010 French biographical political film directed by Julian Schnabel. 

Miral may also refer to:

 Miral (name), list of people with the name
 Miral (2022 film), an Indian film
 Miral Asset Management, holding company in Abu Dhabi
 Château de Miral, castle in France
 , Turkish cargo ship